Adam is believed to have been the first human being on Earth and the first prophet (nabī) of Islam. Adam's role as the father of the human race is looked upon by Muslims with reverence. Muslims also refer to his wife, Hawā (Eve), as the "mother of mankind". Muslims see Adam as the first Muslim, as the Quran states that all the Prophets preached the same faith of Islam (Submission to God).

According to Islamic belief, Adam was created from the material of the earth and brought to life by God. God placed Adam in a paradisical Garden. After Adam sinned by eating from the forbidden tree (Tree of Immortality), paradise was declined to him, but he may return if Adam repents from his sin. This story is seen as both a literal as well as an allegory for human relationship towards God. Islam doesn't necessarily adhere to young earth Creationism, and it is commonly held that life on earth predates Adam.

Quran, hadiths and tales 

The Quran and Hadith give some account of the creation and fall of Adam. Synthesizing the Quran with Sunni interpretations can produce the following account. God created Adam, according to the Quran, from mud or clay and breathed his spirit (rūḥī) into him. Hadith add that he was named Adam after the clay he was made out of, or the skin (adim) of the earth. Some exegetes report that God sent the Angel of Death to gather dust from the earth. The various skin-colors of people are due to the different colors of soil used in creating Adam. The soil also contributed to the idea that there are good people and bad people and everything in between in the world. A Hadith from Sahih al-Bukhari narrated by Abu Hurairah states that Adam was created 60 cubits tall (about 30 meters), and that people in Paradise will look like Adam.

According to the Quran, when God informed the angels that he was going to put a successor on Earth, they questioned why God would set wherein a human who would cause blood shed and damage. God then teaches Adam "the names of all things" and assembles the angels in front of Adam so as to show them that the angels know only "save what Thou Hast taught us", but Adam could tell all names. God commands the angels to prostrate before Adam wherein all amongst them obeyed except for Iblis (Satan), who claimed: "I am better than him. You created me of fire while him you created of mud." His disobedience of God's command followed by attributing injustice to God, caused him to fall out of God's favor:"And behold, We said to the angels: "Bow down to Adam" and they bowed down. Not so Iblis: he refused and was haughty: He was/became of those who reject faith." (2:34)

Adam and his unnamed wife (tradition identify her with Hawā), in Garden Eden. In Sunni traditions, based on biblical reports (Israʼiliyyat), it is said that, when Adam was sleeping, God took a rib from him and from it he created Eve. While the creation of Adam and Eve is referred to in the Quran, the exact method of creation is not specified. God tells them that they are free to enjoy of its fruits except not to come near the "tree of immortality", but the devil (shaiṭān) was able to convince them to taste it: "He said, "Your Lord has forbidden this tree to you only to prevent you from becoming angels or immortals."" (7:21) Whereupon God sends Adam and his wife to earth, there they are condemned to "live and die", but is willing to forgive them. When Adam was cast out of Garden Eden, Adam turned towards God and begged for forgiveness. Therefore, there isn't a doctrine of Original sin in Islamic theology (Kalām) and Adam's sin is not carried by all of his children.

In the Qiṣaṣ al-Anbiyāʾ (Prophetic tales) Adam and Eve were cast down far apart, so that they had to search for each other and eventually met each other at Mount Arafat. Hadith say that once Adam was on earth, God (sometimes Gabriel at service of God) taught him how to plant seeds and bake bread. This was to become the way of all of Adam's children. Adam proceeded to live for about 960 years, though this has been a topic of debate. Humankind would have learned everything from Adam. He was the first to learn to plant, harvest, and bake as well as the first to be told how to repent and how to properly bury someone. It is also said by some scholars that God also revealed the various food restrictions and the alphabet to Adam. He was made the first prophet and it is said that he was taught 21 scrolls and was able to write them himself.

Theological significance 
Adam features as an archetype humans and their relationship to God in Muslim theology and philosophy. According to hadiths, Adam was created in God's own image, and according to the Quran, was "taught all the names", thus establishing the notion of Adam as a reflection of God's divine attributes. By that, Adam doesn't feature as a prophet or a male human being only, but also encapsulates the idea of an ideal human archetype. Since God has forgiven Adam's transgression, humans are not viewed as inherently sinful or in need of redemption. Instead, Adam (or humanity) is viewed as being created form a relationship to God through learning and development.

Suhrawardi (c. 1145 – 1234) discusses the nature of human's soul as a mixture between Adam and Hawwa; Adam referring to the heavenly attributes and Hawwa to earthly animalistic passion. Through a mixture of both, the human soul (nafs) is fashioned and becomes a personal animal soul. He based his anthropology on Quranic verses such as "He who has created you [all] out of one living entity, and out of it brought into being its mate, so that man might incline [with love] towards the woman" (7:189).

According to Tafsir al-Baydawi (d.1319), Adam might stand for an original pattern for all of the spiritual and the corperal existence or  serving as a way for angels to obtain their alloted perfections by submitting to God's command to prostrate before him. Ibn Arabi explains that only Adam can comprehend all the names of God, thereby referring to the perfected heavenly Adam as a reflection of God's names. When Iblis failed to submit to God's command, he attributed injustice to the reality (al-Haqq).

‘Iṣmah 
Muslim scholars can be divided into two groups regarding  Adam's impeccability (‘iṣmah): One argues that Adam only became a prophet after he was cast out of paradise. They adhere to the doctrine that ‘iṣmah only applies to prophets after they were sent to a mission. But since there was no population to whom Adam could have been sent, he could not have been a prophet and therefore ‘iṣmah didn't apply until he left paradise. These arguments are, however, rejected by those who argue that prophethood doesn't start with preaching God's word and thus ‘iṣmah begins before the prophetic mission. According to the second point of view, Adam was predestined by God to eat from the forbidden tree, because God planned to set Adam and his progeny on earth from the beginning and thus installed Adam's fall. By that Adam wouldn't have truly disobeyed, but acted in accordance with God's will to his best ability. For that reason, many Muslim exegetes do not regard Adam and Eve's expulsion from paradise as punishment for disobedience or a result from abused free will on their part, but as part of God's wisdom (ḥikma) and plan for humanity to experience the full range of his attributes, his love, forgiveness, and power to his creation. By their former abode in paradise, they can hope for return during their life-time.

Some Muslim scholars view Adam as an image for his descendants: Humans sin, become aware of it, repent (Tawba), and find back to God. Adam embodies humanity and his fall shows humans how to act, when they sinned. Unlike Iblis (Satan), Adam asked for forgiveness for his transgression.

Adam and the angels 
The story of angels prostrating before Adam gave rise to various debates about whether humans or angels rank higher. Angels bowing down before Adam is mentioned as evidence for human's superiority over the angels. Others hold that the prostration does not imply such a thing, but was merely a command or test for the angels. A position, especially found among Mu'tazilites and some Asharites, holds that angels are superior due to their lack of urges and desires. Maturidism generally does not think any of these creatures is superior to the other, and that angels' and prophets' obedience derive from their virtues and insights to God's action, but not as their original purity.

In the Quranic version of Adam's fall, Satan tempted them with the promise to become immortal angels. Al-Qushayri comments on 7:20, that Adam's fall is for his wish to be like an angel, while angels' fall is because when they desired to be like human. Adam desired an angelic state of no passion and avoiding the fate of death, while Harut and Marut desired the freedom of choice and to rejoice in extravagance.

Life before Adam 
It is evident from the Quran that Adam was the father of contemporary humanity, but if were has been sentient life before is debated. According to some views, God created thirty times an Adam every 1000 years. After the downfall of each humanity, God left the world uninhabited for 50.000 years, then 50.000 inhabited, and then a new Adam created. The majority of scholars, however, rejects this opinion, but they agree that the jinn and animals have lived on earth before. According to the Majallat Al Azhar, nowhere within Islamic texts it is prescribed how long humans existed and every Muslim is free to think that is right, and that the notion of a young earth derives   from biblical reports (Israʼiliyyat).

Genealogy of Adam
Though it is up for debate, it has been said that Eve went through 120 pregnancies with Adam and each of these consisted of a set of twins: a boy and a girl. In some other traditions, their first child was a girl, born alone, called ʿAnāq. According to several sources, God took all of Adam's progeny from his back while they were still in heaven. He asked each of them "am I not your lord?" as read in verse 7:172 and they all replied yes. For this reason, it is believed that all humans are born with an innate knowledge of God. The most famous of Adam's children are Cain and Abel. Both the brothers were asked to offer up individual sacrifices to God. God accepted Abel's sacrifice because of Abel's righteousness and Cain, out of jealousy, threw a rock at Abel, leading to the first murder in human history: the murder of Abel by Cain. As Adam grieved his son, he would preach to his other children about God and faith in Him. When Adam's death grew near, he appointed his son Seth as his successor.

Islamic scholar Sayyid Mumtaz Ali, while commenting on whether Adam was first or Eve, says that "the fact that Adam was created first is nothing but childish. To begin with, we are tempted to assert that this is so because it was not acceptable to God that a woman is left without a companion for even a second. Therefore, it is for her sake that he created Adam first. But as a matter of fact, the belief that Adam was created first and then came Eve is part of the Christian and Jewish faith. This is not at all part of the Islamic creed. There is no mention in the Quran about who was created first, Adam or Eve."

See also
 Adam Kadmon
 Biblical and Quranic narratives
 Legends and the Quran
 Muhammad in Islam
 Prophets of Islam
 Stories of The Prophets

Notes

References

External links
Islamic Concept of Adam's Creation 

Adam and Eve
Prophets of the Quran
Hebrew Bible prophets of the Quran